Colin Ayden Johnstone (born 24 October 1996 in Hamilton, New Zealand) is a New Zealand rugby union player who plays for the  in Super Rugby. His playing position is prop. He was first signed to the Highlanders squad in 2019.

Reference list

External links
itsrugby.co.uk profile

1996 births
New Zealand rugby union players
Living people
Rugby union props
Waikato rugby union players
Highlanders (rugby union) players
Rugby union players from Hamilton, New Zealand